Subachoque is a municipality and town of Colombia in the Western Savanna Province, part of the department of Cundinamarca. Subachoque is part of the Metropolitan Area of Bogotá and borders Zipaquirá, Tabio and Tenjo in the east, Zipaquirá and Pacho in the north, San Francisco and Supatá in the west and Madrid and El Rosal in the south.
Subachoque is composed of 17 subdivisions: Altania, Canica Alta, Canica Baja, Cascajal, El Guamal, El Pantano, El Páramo, El Tobal, Galdámez, La Cuesta, La Pradera, La Unión, La Yegüera, Llanitos, Rincón Santo, Santa Rosa, Tibagota, El Valle.

Etymology 
The name Subachoque comes from Chibcha and means either "Work of the Sun" or "Farmfields of the front".

History 
In the times before the Spanish conquest, the area of Subachoque formed part of the Muisca Confederation, a loose confederation of different rulers of the Muisca. Subachoque was reigned by the zipa based in Bacatá.

Modern Subachoque was founded on March 16, 1774 by the priest Jacinto Roque Salgado. After the spanisch Crown gave the terrains and allowance to Spanish families in order to colonize the area, the indigenous peoples that lived by the time in that area were relocated in another areas of Colombia or executed if refused to be moved. Subachoque is one of the few towns in Colombia whose habitants are descendants mostly only from Spanish or European roots. During the iron production that took place at La pradera between the years 1850 to the early 1900s the arrival of North Americans, British, French and Germans placed a small mark into the habitants of this peculiar town.  

The Subachoque area was also the battleground for the Battle of Campo Amalia, also known as the Battle of Subachoque in 1861.

Economy 
Main economical activities of Subachoque are agriculture, livestock farming and small-scale mining. The most important agricultural products cultivated are potatoes, carrots, peas and fruits as peaches, pears, strawberries and apples.

Geology 
The Subachoque Formation is named after Subachoque.

Born in Subachoque 
 Nemesio Camacho, businessman and politician

Gallery

References 

Municipalities of Cundinamarca Department
Populated places established in 1774
1774 establishments in the Spanish Empire